Michael Barry (born 28 June 1954) is a Canadian wrestler. He competed in the men's freestyle 57 kg at the 1976 Summer Olympics.

References

1954 births
Living people
Canadian male sport wrestlers
Olympic wrestlers of Canada
Wrestlers at the 1976 Summer Olympics
Sportspeople from Saint John, New Brunswick
Commonwealth Games medallists in wrestling
Commonwealth Games silver medallists for Canada
Wrestlers at the 1978 Commonwealth Games
20th-century Canadian people
Medallists at the 1978 Commonwealth Games